Manfred Winkelhock (6 October 1951 – 12 August 1985) was a German racing driver. He participated in 56 Formula One Grands Prix (with 47 starts) between 1980 and 1985, driving for Arrows, ATS, Brabham and RAM Racing, with a best finish of fifth at the 1982 Brazilian Grand Prix. He is the older brother of Joachim and Thomas Winkelhock and father of Markus Winkelhock, who are all also racing drivers.

Racing career
Born in Waiblingen on 6 October 1951, Manfred Winkelhock was the older brother of Joachim Winkelhock. He began racing in Formula Two in 1978 and survived a major crash at Nürburgring Nordschleife circuit, when he flipped his March at the very steep rise-and-fall Flugplatz corner. 

Winkelhock along with Hervé Poulain and Marcel Mignot drove a BMW M1 Group 4 racing version that was painted by pop artist Andy Warhol for the 1979 24 Hours of Le Mans. They completed came in 6th overall and 2nd in their class.

Winkelhock's first attempt at qualifying for a Formula One Grand Prix race was in Italy, when he stood in for the injured Jochen Mass at Arrows.

His son, Markus Winkelhock, is also a racing driver.

Death
At the same time he was a regular sports car and touring car driver, winning the 1000km Monza with Marc Surer in 1985. He was killed in the summer of 1985 when he crashed heavily at the fearsome Turn 2 at Mosport Park of Bowmanville near Toronto, Ontario, Canada, during the Budweiser 1000 km World Endurance Championship event, driving a Porsche 962C for Kremer Racing with co-driver Marc Surer. The crash was Sunday, 11 August and he succumbed to injuries the next day while at the Sunnybrook Medical Center in Toronto.

At the time of Winkelhock's death, he was a driver for the Skoal Bandit sponsored RAM Racing team in Formula One, though it had been a frustrating season with a best finish of 12th in the 1985 French Grand Prix at Paul Ricard. His death saw him replaced by Northern Irish driver Kenny Acheson, though lack of money saw the team fold before the end of the  season.

Racing record

Complete European Formula Two Championship results
(key) (Races in bold indicate pole position; races in italics indicate fastest lap)

Complete Formula One results
(key)

References

1951 births
1985 deaths
People from Waiblingen
Sportspeople from Stuttgart (region)
German racing drivers
German Formula One drivers
Arrows Formula One drivers
ATS Wheels Formula One drivers
Brabham Formula One drivers
RAM Racing Formula One drivers
European Formula Two Championship drivers
Racing drivers who died while racing
Deutsche Tourenwagen Masters drivers
Sport deaths in Canada
Accidental deaths in Ontario
24 Hours of Le Mans drivers
Racing drivers from Baden-Württemberg
World Sportscar Championship drivers